The office of Speaker of the National Assembly of Tanganyika was originally held by the Governor of Tanganyika, from the National Assembly's creation in 1926 as the Legislative Council of Tanzania Mainland, until 1953. The first speaker of the office not a governor of Tanganyika was Sir William Scupham and the last was Adam Sapi Mkwaka, who, in 1964, became the Speaker of the National Assembly of Tanzania.

Below is a list of all the individuals who have held the office of Speaker of the National Assembly of Tanganyika.

References

 Taylor, James Clagett: "Political development of Tanganyika"

See also
List of speakers of the National Assembly of Tanzania

History of Tanganyika
Politics of Tanganyika
Tanganyika
Lists of Tanzanian politicians